The Panjshir River flows through the Panjshir Valley in northeastern Afghanistan,  north of Kabul. Its main tributary is the Ghorband River which flows from the Parwan Province and joins the Panjshir River 10 km east of Charikar in Bagram District. The Panjshir River takes its source near the Anjuman Pass and flows southward through the Hindu Kush and joins the Kabul River at the town of Surobi. A dam was built on the Panjshir River near Surobi in the 1950s to supply water from the Panjshir River to the Kabul River. There is just one permanent bridge on the Panjshir River that provides access to the Bagram Airport. On 12 July 2018, there was a flood in Panjshir Valley in which ten people were killed.

See also 
 Panjshir Province
 Panjshir Valley

References

External links 
 Photo of Panjshir River
Streamflow Characteristics at Streamgages in Northern Afghanistan and Selected Locations
Map of river basins in Afghanistan

Rivers of Afghanistan
Kabul River
Landforms of Panjshir Province
Landforms of Kabul Province